Tenbosch Park, Tenbosch  or Tenbos (meaning in the bush), is a public park in the municipality of Ixelles in Brussels, Belgium. It is surrounded by a wall and offers an unexpected oasis of calm in a busy district.

Tenbosch is within a short walking distance of the Avenue Louise/Louizalaan, the Ixelles Ponds, La Cambre Abbey, and the Bois de la Cambre/Ter Kamerenbos.

History
The area was formerly a privately owned dendrological garden called Semet after its owner. In 1982, the estate became the property of the Brussels-Capital Region, which entrusted the company R.Pechère + Partners with the task of transforming it into a public park. They were tasked with preserving the spirit of the Semet-Solvay garden while transforming the existing paths into urban walks. The park has been open to the public since 1986.

Opening hours
Tenbosch Park is open during the following hours:
 from 1 October to 31 March, from 8 a.m. to 5.50 p.m.;
 from 1 to 30 April, from 8 a.m. to 6.50 p.m.;
 from 1 May to 31 August, from 8 a.m. to 8.50 p.m.;
 from 1 to 30 September, from 8 a.m. to 7.50 p.m.

Gallery

See also
 List of parks and gardens in Brussels

External links

 Description of the park on the Brussels Tourist Office website

Parks in Brussels
Urban public parks
Ixelles